Oncorhynchus lacustris (syn. Rhabdofario lacustris) is an extinct species of prehistoric freshwater trout from the late Miocene to late Pliocene of Western North America.  Its fossils have been found in lacustrine deposits in what is now Idaho.

See also
Oncorhynchus rastrosus

 Prehistoric fish
 List of prehistoric bony fish

External links
 Bony fish in the online Sepkoski Database

Prehistoric teleostei
Oncorhynchus
Miocene fish
Pliocene fish
Piacenzian extinctions
Neogene fish of North America